is a 1969 jidaigeki manga series by Takao Saito. It follows the adventures of three ronin - Jubei (十兵衛), Sunlight (日光), and Moonlight (月光) - who dedicate their lives to hunt down "shadows", the ninja spies of the Tokugawa shogunate.

Films
The series was later adapted into two live-action films in 1972  Kage Gari and Kage Gari Hoero taiho directed by Toshio Masuda and screenplay by Kaneo Ikegami.

Kage Gari
(June 10, 1972, Runningtime 90minutes)
Yujiro Ishihara as Muroto Jubei
Ryōhei Uchida as Niko (Sunlight)
Mikio Narita as Geiko (Moonlight)
Ruriko Asaoka as Chitose
Isao Tamagawa as Shouji Sukejuro
Kōjirō Kusanagi as Jinma Senjuro
Shinjirō Ehara as Kosaka Kurando
Tetsurō Tamba as Tanuma Ogitsugu
Shunsuke Kariya as Koroku
Ryutaro Tatsumi as Makino Zusho

Kage Gari Hoero Taihō
(October 10, 1972, Runningtime 89minutes)
Yujiro Ishihara as Muroto Jubei
Ryōhei Uchida as Sunlight (日光)
Mikio Narita Moonlight (月光) 
Tetsurō Tamba as Kage Metsuke
Mari Shiraki as Osen
 Junko Natsu as Shibatsuji Miya
Yoshi Katō as Michinari Shibatsuji
Kenji Sahara as Besho Hayato

Other adaptations
Kage Gari (Television drama in 1983) starring by Tatsuya Nakadai, Directed by Akira Inoue.
Shin Kage Gari (新・影狩り), a new manga series by Kenji Okamura in 2011.

References

External links 
 
Saito production
Ishihara Yujiro Senka
Ishihara Yujiro Senka - Kage Gari
Ishihara Yujiro Senka - Kage Gari Hoero cannon

1969 manga
Shogakukan manga
1972 films
1970s Japanese-language films
Jidaigeki films
Ninja in anime and manga
Samurai in anime and manga
Takao Saito
Toho films
1970s Japanese films